A Lineage of Grace is a series of five historical fiction novellas written by the American author Francine Rivers. Each novella details the story of a woman in the lineage of Jesus Christ described in the New Testament - Tamar, Rahab, Ruth, Bathsheba, and Mary. The book was released in 2002 by Tyndale House Publishers.  It has been published in hardcover, paperback, audio and e-book versions in several languages.

Awards
It won the Retailer's Choice Award in 2009.

References

External links 
 Francine Rivers Official Website

2002 American novels
American historical novels
American Christian novels
Cultural depictions of Bathsheba